team AkzoNobel is a Volvo Ocean 65 yacht. She was the only new yacht built for the 2017–18 Volvo Ocean Race.

2017-18 crew
Simeon Tienpont - skipper
Jules Salter - navigator
Chris Nicholson
Peter van Niekerk
Brad Farrand 
António Fontes (loaned from Team Sun Hung Kai/Scallywag)
Martine Grael
Luke Molloy 
Ross Monson 
Emily Nagel 
Nicolai Sehested
Álex Pella
Justin Ferris

Leadership dispute
On October 13, the day before the first scoring race, it was announced that, due to a breach of contract by his company, STEAM Racing, Tienpont's contract as skipper was terminated by Team AkzoNobel. Watch captain Brad Jackson was promoted to skipper in the place of Tienpont. Two hours before the start of leg 1, Tienpont was re-instated by an arbitration panel. As a result, Jackson, Jules Salter, Joca Signorini and Rome Kirby opted not to sail in leg 1 of the race.

References

Volvo Ocean Race yachts
Volvo Ocean 65 yachts
Sailing yachts of the Netherlands
2010s sailing yachts